The Art of Noise was a short-lived radio program that aired in December 1994. There were 3 hour-long episodes and it was broadcast on BBC Radio 1. It starred George Martin.

References

BBC Radio 1 programmes